Adelaide, Colorado  (formerly Robinson) is a former mining camp and railroad water stop along what is now known as Phantom Canyon Road in Fremont County, Colorado.  The elevation of the ghost town is 6,950 feet (2,118 m). The Adelaide Bridge is located just north of the townsite.

History
Prior to the construction of the railroad bridge, the town was named "Robinson." A post office was established at Adelaide in 1894, and remained in operation until 1901.

In 1894, the Adelaide Bridge was constructed as a 210-foot-long, 20-foot-wide narrow-gauge railroad passage for the Florence and Cripple Creek Railroad to carry gold mined in the region. The bridge and track were abandoned in 1912 and the railroad went out of business in 1915. The bridge was added to the National Register of Historic Places in 1985.

References

Mining communities in Colorado
Fremont County, Colorado